Hugh Martin McHugh (born 1973) is a Northern Irish international lawn bowler.

Bowls career

World Championships
McHugh has competed in four World Bowls Championships in 2000, 2008, 2012 and 2016. He won a triples bronze medal in the 2000 World Outdoor Bowls Championship and in 2016, was part of the combined Irish fours team with Simon Martin, Neil Mulholland and Ian McClure that won a bronze medal in Christchurch. In 2020 he was selected for the 2020 World Outdoor Bowls Championship in Australia.

Commonwealth Games
McHugh has also competed in seven Commonwealth Games in 1998 and 2002, 2006, 2010, 2014, 2018 and 2022. He won a fours gold medal at the 1998 Commonwealth Games.

McHugh was selected for his sixth Games as part of the Northern Ireland team for the 2018 Commonwealth Games on the Gold Coast in Queensland. In 2022, he competed in the men's pairs and the men's fours at the 2022 Commonwealth Games. In the fours the team of Sam Barkley, Adam McKeown, Ian McClure and McHugh won the gold medal defeating India in the final.

National
He has been capped 91 times by Ireland.

He is the winner of eighteen senior titles at the Irish National Bowls Championships. He has won six singles and went undefeated for four years winning in 2003, 2004, 2005 and 2006, the other two wins came in 2013 and 2015. In addition to the six singles he has won six pairs (five with Barry Browne 2002, 2005, 2006, 2013, 2014) and (one with Sam Barkley 2021), two triples (2016, 2017), two fours (1996 & 2005) and two junior titles.

Other
He also has four British Isles Bowls Championships, three singles (2004, 2005 & 2016) and one pairs (1999) with Barry Browne (2007)  and also has a record of 35 NIBA championships. In 2011 he won a silver medal and in 2015 he won two bronze medals at the Atlantic Bowls Championships. He also won the Private greens league championship pairs in 2021 with Sam Barkley.

References

External links
  (1998–2014)
 
 
 
 

1973 births
Living people
Irish male lawn bowls players
Male lawn bowls players from Northern Ireland
Commonwealth Games medallists in lawn bowls
Commonwealth Games gold medallists for Northern Ireland
Bowls players at the 1998 Commonwealth Games
Bowls players at the 2002 Commonwealth Games
Bowls players at the 2006 Commonwealth Games
Bowls players at the 2010 Commonwealth Games
Bowls players at the 2014 Commonwealth Games
Bowls players at the 2018 Commonwealth Games
Bowls players at the 2022 Commonwealth Games
Medallists at the 2022 Commonwealth Games